Real Crime is a British documentary television series produced by ITV Studios for the ITV network. Each episode examines a notorious crime and includes interviews with relatives of the victims. It was broadcast from 2001 to 2011, and ended after ten series. From 2008 until 2011, each episode was presented by Mark Austin and from 2010 was listed as Real Crime with Mark Austin.

Episodes

Series 1 (2001)
 Wednesday 6 June 10:20pm – The Hunt for Wearside Jack
 Wednesday 13 June 10:20pm – I Was a Great Train Robber
 Wednesday 20 June 10:20pm – Ben Needham: Somebody Knows
 Wednesday 27 June 10:20pm – The Rachel Nickell Story
 Wednesday 11 July 10:35pm – Who Killed the Pageant Queen? - Murder of JonBenét Ramsey
 Wednesday 5 September 10:20pm – The Gang the Krays Feared
 Wednesday 12 September 10:20pm – Suzy Lamplugh

Series 2 (2002)
 Monday 18 March 11:00pm – Kenny Noye: A Face from the Past
 Friday 12 April 11:00pm – Justice for Julie 
 Tuesday 7 May 9:00pm – Crocodile Tears
 Tuesday 14 May 9:00pm – Tracie Andrews: Blood on her Hands
 Monday 24 June 10:30pm – Mr Nice Guy
 Monday 1 July 11:00pm – Starring John Bindon
 Monday 15 July 11:00pm – The Truth About the Babes in the Wood
 Monday 29 July 10:25pm – Cracking the Killers' Code
 Monday 5 August 11:00pm – The Heiress and the Kidnapper
 Monday 12 August 10:25pm – Angel of Death: The Beverly Allitt Story
 Monday 30 September 11:00pm – Britain's Richest Killer

Series 3 (2003)
 Sunday 27 April – Justice for My Daughter
 Monday 29 September 11:00pm – 'Til Death Us Do Part 
 Tuesday 14 October 9:00pm – Lady Jane
 Sunday 21 December 11:20pm – A Mind to Murder

Series 4 (2004)
 Monday 5 January 11:00pm – Jeremy Bamber
 Monday 26 January 11:00pm – Love You to Death
 Monday 29 March 11:00pm – Girlsnatcher
 Tuesday 15 June 9:00pm – Who Killed the Pageant Queen?: The Prime Suspect

Series 5 (2006)
 Monday 3 July 9:00pm – Skydiver: Murder or Suicide?
 Monday 2 October 11:00pm – Married to a Monster: At Home with the M25 Rapist

Series 6 (2007)
 Tuesday 9 January 11:00pm – The Caroline Dickinson Murder
 Tuesday 16 January 11:00pm – Lady in the Lake
 Tuesday 27 February 11:00pm – The Beauty Salon Murder
 Tuesday 20 March 11:00pm – The Almost Perfect Murder
 Tuesday 27 March 11:00pm – The Perverted World of Marc Dutroux
 Tuesday 17 April 11:00pm – Killed by a Perfect Son
 Tuesday 24 April 11:00pm – A Killer Came Calling
 Tuesday 1 May 11:00pm – A Deadly Secret
 Tuesday 8 May 11:00pm – Nailing the Nail Bomber

Series 7 (2008)
 Monday 28 April 9:00pm – Murder at Harvey Nicks
 Wednesday 25 June 9:00pm – The Fight for Sarah's Law
 Monday 22 September 10:35pm – Serial Killer on Camera
 Monday 29 September 10:35pm – The 30 Year Secret
 Monday 6 October 10:35pm – The Hunt for Mr Swirl
 Thursday 16 October 9:00pm – A Very Special Constable
 Thursday 23 October 9:00pm – Death of a Hostess
 Thursday 30 October 9:00pm – The Suffolk Strangler
 Thursday 13 November 10:40pm – The Cat and Mouse Killer
 Wednesday 19 November 10:50pm – Diamond Geezers
 Thursday 27 November 10:40pm – Killer on the Run
 Thursday 4 December 10:40pm – The Angel of Death
 Thursday 11 December 9:00pm – James Bulger: A Mother's Story
 Monday 15 December 10:40pm – Death on the Bay
 Wednesday 17 December 10:40pm – The Mystery of the Missing Earl

Series 8 (2009)
 Monday 15 June 9:00pm – Rhys Jones: Caught in the Crossfire
 Monday 22 June 9:00pm – Rachel Nickell: Case Closed
 Monday 29 June 9:00pm – Sally Anne Bowman: Death on the Doorstep
 Monday 6 July 9:00pm – Hannah's Killer: Nowhere to Hide
 Thursday 23 July 10:35pm – The Man Who Didn't Cry
 Thursday 30 July 10:35pm – A Shot in the Dark
 Thursday 6 August 10:35pm – The Tesco Bomber
 Tuesday 1 December 10:35pm – Bombers on the Run

Series 9 (2010)
 Thursday 14 January 10:35pm – Tobin: Portrait of a Serial Killer
 Monday 16 August 9:00pm – Death on Duty
 Monday 23 August 9:00pm – Murder of a Father
 Thursday 2 September 9pm – Yvonne Fletcher: Justice Betrayed
 Monday 27 September 10:35pm – Bringing Down the Gooch
 Monday 4 October 10:35pm – Britain's Biggest Heist
 Monday 11 October 10:35pm – The Black Cab Rapist
 Monday 18 October 10:35pm – Gunn Law

Series 10 (2011)
 Monday 7 November 10:35pm – The Game Show Killer
 Monday 14 November 10:35pm – The Jigsaw Murder
 Monday 21 November 10:35pm – Fallen Angel
 Monday 28 November 10:35pm – Raoul Moat: Manhunt

References

External links
 .

2001 British television series debuts
2011 British television series endings
2000s British crime television series
2010s British crime television series
ITV documentaries
Television series by ITV Studios
English-language television shows
True crime television series